Brian Richard Gibbs (6 October 1936 – 27 January 2014) was an English professional footballer who played as a forward.

Playing career
Born in Gillingham, Dorset Gibbs began his career on the South Coast with non-league Gosport Borough. In 1957, he joined Bournemouth & Boscombe Athletic, scoring 15 goals in 58 appearances. In 1962, he joined the Kent club Gillingham, where he made over 250 appearances and scored 101 league goals. He left Gillingham in 1968 after aiding the team to the 1963–64 Fourth Division championship to join Colchester United, where he spent four years scoring 40 goals in over 150 league appearances. He won the Watney Cup in 1971 with the U's, before stepping out of league football to join Bletchley Town.

Management career
Gibbs became team manager of New Bradwell St Peter in 1975, and under his guidance the club won the South Midlands League Division One title in the 1976–77 season.

Death
Gibbs died on 27 January 2014 at the age of 77.

Honours

Club
Gillingham
 Football League Fourth Division Winner (1): 1963–64

Colchester United
 Watney Cup Winner (1): 1971

References

1936 births
2014 deaths
People from Gillingham, Kent
Association football inside forwards
English footballers
Gosport Borough F.C. players
AFC Bournemouth players
Gillingham F.C. players
Colchester United F.C. players
Milton Keynes City F.C. players
English Football League players
New Bradwell St Peter F.C. managers
English football managers